JBJ may refer to:

Groups
 JBJ (band), a South Korean boy group
 JBJ95, a South Korean musical duo

People 
listed alphabetically by first name
 J. B. Jeyaretnam (1926–2008), Singaporean politician and lawyer
 Jackie Bradley Jr. (born 1990), American professional baseball player
 Jon Bon Jovi (born 1962), American musician
 Jon "Bones" Jones (born 1987), American mixed martial arts fighter
 Jorge Bom Jesus (born 1962), Prime Minister of São Tomé and Príncipe

Other uses 
 Dombano language, denoted by ISO 639-3 code "jbj"
 JBJ Soul Kitchen, an American non-profit organization
 Jhoom Barabar Jhoom, a 2007 Bollywood film

See also